Dahabenzapple is a live album by pianist, saxophonist and composer Joe Maneri which was recorded in 1993 and released on the HatOLOGY label in 1997.

Track listing
All compositions by Joe Maneri
 "Dahabenzapple" – 20:56
 "The Love You're Giving Us" – 21:33
 "Dedication" – 23:52

Personnel 
Joe Maneri – piano, reeds
Mat Maneri – violin
Cecil McBee – bass
Randy Peterson – drums

References

Hathut Records live albums
Joe Maneri live albums
1996 live albums